Lukin or Lukins is a surname. Notable people with the surname include:

 Andrey Lukin (born 1948), Russian chess player and coach
 Dean Lukin (born 1960), Australian weightlifter
 Henry Lukin (1860–1925), South African military commander
 George Lukins, Yatton dœmoniac
 Lionel Lukin (1742–1834), English inventor of the life boat
 Lionel Lukin (judge) (died 1944), Australian judge
 Matt Lukin (born 1964), American rock musician (bassist: Melvins, Mudhoney)
 Mikhail Lukin (born 1971) Russian-American physicist
Robert Lukins, Australian writer
 Sheila Lukins, American cook and food writer
 Vladimir Lukin (born 1937), Russian liberal political activist

Fictional characters:
 Aleksander Lukin, Marvel Comics villain

See also
 "Lukin" (song), a song by Pearl Jam
 Lukin - Per breve de private Sigillo, see also Charter of Virginia
 Liukin, a Russian language surname sometimes pronounced as "Lukin"
 Luken
 Lukens

Russian-language surnames